Emiliano Humberto Pedreira Salgado (born 5 November 1985) is an Argentine footballer.

He played for Ñublense.

References
 
 
 

1985 births
Living people
Argentine footballers
Argentine expatriate footballers
Club Atlético Acassuso footballers
UD Los Barrios footballers
UD Almería B players
Ñublense footballers
Primera B de Chile players
Expatriate footballers in Chile
Association football defenders
Footballers from Buenos Aires